The former Carlton Cinema (and then Mecca Bingo) is an Art deco Grade II* listed building, located at 161–169 Essex Road, Islington, London. It was completed in 1930 as a cine-variety theatre with a capacity of 2,226 seats.

Architect George Coles decided for an Egyptian style facade dressed in multi-coloured Hathernware tiles. The discovery of Tutankhamun’s tomb in November 1922 influenced the Art Deco style and the buildings erected in that period, particularly cinemas and theatres.

Inside, the building is mainly Empire style, with Egyptian decorations in the foyer, whilst the auditorium has a French Renaissance style.

The Carlton Cinema was taken over by Associated British Cinemas Ltd. (ABC) in February 1935. It was renamed ABC in 1962. Then it was the Carlton cinema during the 60's which for the younger generation meant Saturday morning pictures.
The building was then converted into a bingo hall which continued for almost 35 years as the Mecca Bingo Club, until closing in March 2007.

It was purchased by an evangelical Christian church Resurrection Manifestations in 2013, who planned to partially reopen it as a cinema, also converting the former cafe area into a second screen. It was reopened in 2015 as Gracepoint, a 900 capacity venue available for hire and an active church.

The façade and foyer of the building appear as the Roxy Cinema in episode 2 series 5 of Endeavour, titled Cartouche.

References

External links
 Gracepoint website

Art Deco architecture in London
Buildings and structures completed in 1930
Grade II* listed buildings in the London Borough of Islington
Churches in the London Borough of Islington
Egyptian Revival architecture in the United Kingdom
Former cinemas in London